Dorsey B. Thomas (October 18, 1823 – June 5, 1897) was a former Speaker of the Tennessee Senate from  	1869–1871. This position had been the designated successor to the Governor of Tennessee so akin to Lieutenant Governor of Tennessee.

References

External links 

 The Political Graveyard

Lieutenant Governors of Tennessee
Tennessee state senators
1823 births
1897 deaths
19th-century American politicians